Laura Cayouette (born July 11, 1964) is an American actress.

Early life
Cayouette was born in Washington, D.C. and grew up in Maryland. Laura graduated from the University of Maryland, College Park with a BA in English, then graduated a year later from University of South Alabama with an M.A. in Creative Writing and English Literature. In 2014, Cayouette was made their Distinguished Alumni Award Recipient  and her name was added to the university's clock tower. 
Before pursuing a career in acting, Cayouette worked as a nightclub DJ, model, English professor, dress shop manager  and a ticket taker at Universal City Walk Hollywood. She studied at the American Academy of Dramatic Arts in New York  before moving to Los Angeles in 1992.  There, she studied with Milton Katselas at the Beverly Hills Playhouse, then with Ivana Chubbuck at her studio.

Career

Best known as Lara Lee Candie-Fitzwilly, the sister of the main antagonist in Quentin Tarantino's Django Unchained, Cayouette's acting career started in 1996 with a role in The Evening Star (1996), the sequel to Terms of Endearment, opposite Shirley MacLaine and Juliette Lewis. The same year she worked with David Duchovny and Garry Shandling on an award-winning episode of The Larry Sanders Show and followed that with the Friends episode "The One With the Screamer".

Cayouette has worked with Tarantino four times. He first directed her in Kill Bill, Vol. 2 (2004), then produced as she acted in Daltry Calhoun, a 2005 film directed by Charles Bronson’s daughter, Katrina Holden Bronson. In 2008, Cayouette and Tarantino produced Hell Ride, a biker movie featuring Cayouette, Dennis Hopper, Michael Madsen and David Carradine, and followed that up with Django Unchained (2012).

During her 25-year career, Cayouette has worked with Matthew McConaughey, Woody Harrelson, Will Smith, Richard Dreyfuss, Kevin Costner, Christoph Waltz, Samuel L. Jackson, Arnold Schwarzenegger, Abigail Breslin, Elizabeth Banks, Scott Bakula, Kerry Washington, Walton Goggins, Gene Hackman, Jamie Foxx, Christopher Lloyd, Christina Hendricks, Hayden Christensen, David Morse, Michael Jai White, Kate Bosworth, Ruth Buzzi, Mykelti Williamson, Malcolm McDowell, Lauren Holly, Johnny Knoxville, Josh Charles, Kofi Siriboe, Sammo Hung, Candy Clark, Arsenio Hall, Dick Van Dyke and many more. Directors include Tony Scott, Sam Raimi, Anthony Hemingway, Cary Joji Fukunaga, Todd Holland, Peter Gould, Martin Campbell, Louis Letterier, and Bertrand Blier.

Cayouette directed Joanna Cassidy and Danica McKellar in the 2004 short film, Intermission then directed Richard Dreyfuss and Mircea Monroe in the 2011 short film, Lone Star Trixie. Cayouette is the first person to ever wear a Project Runway dress to the Oscars. Designer Austin Scarlett accompanied her to the event.

Cayouette has written seven books, including Know Small Parts: An Actor's Guide to Turning Minutes into Moments and Moments into a Career with foreword by Richard Dreyfuss and endorsements from Kevin Costner, Reginald Hudlin, and Lou Diamond Phillips. She is also the author of a coming of age novel, Lemonade Farm, and the amateur-sleuth Charlotte Reade Mysteries series set in New Orleans  and  highlighting cultural events like Jazz Fest, Southern Decadence, and the Mardi Gras Indians’ Super Sunday, as well as moments like the Saints Super Bowl victory during Carnival, the BP oil spill, and Hurricane Isaac.

Cayouette writes a blog, LAtoNOLA.com, recounting many of those same events as well as dancing with the New Orleans Pussyfooters in the Mardi Gras parades and riding with Quentin Tarantino in the Monarch float after she arranged for him to preside over the Krewe of Orpheus parade during Mardi Gras 2014.

She was elected as a Convention Delegate in the 2019 SAG-AFTRA New Orleans Local election. More recent acting roles include the recurring Marlene in Ava Duverney's Queen Sugar and John Schneider's wife in the film Hate Crime (2017).

Personal life

On May 24, 2014, Cayouette married Andy Gallagher in New Orleans.

Filmography

Films

Television

References

External links
 

American film actresses
American television actresses
Living people
Actresses from Maryland
21st-century American women
1964 births